is a Japanese football player for Zweigen Kanazawa.

Career
After attending Juntendo University, Mori joined Zweigen Kanazawa and debuted against Omiya Ardija.

Club statistics
Updated to 8 July 2019.

References

External links

Profile at J. League
Profile at Zweigen Kanazawa

1995 births
Living people
Association football people from Toyama Prefecture
Japanese footballers
J1 League players
J2 League players
Zweigen Kanazawa players
Shonan Bellmare players
Association football defenders